Royal Consort Suk-bi of the Haeju Choe clan (d. 1184), also known as Princess Jangsin was a Korean royal consort as the fourth wife of King Yejong of Goryeo.

Biography

Early life
Lady Choe was born as the third daughter of Choe Yong and Lady Kim, into the Haeju Choe clan (해주 최씨, 海州 崔氏). Her father was a great-grandson of Choe Chung (최충). She had eight brothers and four sisters.

Marriage and later life
In 1121, King Yejong decided to make Lady Choe his concubine and she entered the palace not long after that. She then given the royal title of Princess Jangsin (장신궁주, 長信宮主) and gave birth to a son, Wang Gak-gwan.

On 1129, she was honoured as Suk-bi (숙비, 淑妃; "Pure Consort") by King Injong, her husband's only son by his second wife. In 1144 (22nd year reign of King Injong), Lady Suk-bi's father was granted the title Susagong (수사공).

The widowed consort died in 1184, during the 14th year of King Myeongjong's reign. The location of her tomb is unknown.

References

Year of birth unknown
1184 deaths
Royal consorts of the Goryeo Dynasty
Choe clan of Haeju